Miss Universe Thailand 2014, the 15th Miss Universe Thailand pageant was held at Royal Paragon Hall, Siam Paragon in Bangkok on May 17, 2014.  The contestants camped in Roi Et. before flying back to Bangkok for the final stage. Chalita Yaemwannang, Miss Universe Thailand 2013,  crowned her successor at the end of this event.

In the final round, broadcast live on Channel 3.  Weluree Ditsayabut, was crowned Miss Universe Thailand 2014 by Chalita Yaemwannang, Miss Universe Thailand 2013. Welureet resigned next month later and 1st Runner-up Pimbongkod Chankaew represented Miss Thailand at Miss Universe 2014 pageant, but not take over the Miss Universe Thailand title.

Results

Placements 
Color keys

Special awards

Judges 
Patra Sila-on – President S&P Public Company Limited Thailand.
Petcharaporn Watcharapol
Asst.Prof. Ua-En-Doo Disakul Na Ayuthaya
Takonkiet Viravan
Wilak Lothong
Preeya Kullavanich
Prissana Sukheepoj
ML Poomchai Chumpol
Jitlada Disayanan
Warintorn Panhakarn – Actor

Delegates 
40 delegates have been confirmed. The information from Miss Universe Thailand Official website

Disqualified 
 #2  Kamphaeng Phet – Fongpikun Thonglim

Replace 
 #2Ratchaburi – Ployputchara Sridara

Notes 
 #7 Warunchana Radomlek competed in Miss Teen Thailand 2013, where she placed at the Top 15.
 #13 Natvaran (Pichamon) Pongboon competed in Miss Thailand 2013, where she placed at the Top 10.
 #27 Pimbongkod Chankaew competed in Miss Thai New Year USA, where she won the title.	
 #31 Chanaporn Jaroensuk competed in Miss Teen Thailand 2011, but did not place.
 #38 Kanokphan Apichaianant competed in Miss Universe Thailand 2012, where she placed at the Top 12.

References

External links 
 
 T-Pageant Club

2014
2014 in Bangkok
2014 beauty pageants
Beauty pageants in Thailand
May 2014 events in Thailand